Arctic Spas is Blue Falls Manufacturing's flagship brand of hot tubs, developed as a niche product for cold climates. The hot tubs and all-weather pools are made and manufactured in Canada and exported to the United States, Australia, and Europe.

History and growth
Blue Falls Manufacturing was founded in the late 1980s as Koko Beach Hot Tub Manufacturing in Edmonton, Alberta. It was purchased in 1997 by its current owners, at the time employees of Blue Falls. The new owners soon began producing the Arctic Spas brand.

In 2001 the company moved to Thorsby and constructed a  facility (later expanded to ), largely because land for a new factory was much cheaper in Thorsby than in Edmonton. In 2003, the company purchased a  facility in Coleman, Alberta to manufacture some of their models. A third facility opened in 2005 in Breton, Alberta. 

The company relies on winter climate branding and energy-efficient technology; testing by provincial authority Alberta Innovates Technology Futures (then the Alberta Research Council) determined that Arctic Spas hot tubs were thirty percent more energy efficient than the competitors that they tested.

In early 2013 they launched a brand of swimming machine, called the All Weather Pool.

Overseas operations
The company focused on the European export market from the beginning, especially the colder climates of Scandinavia and Eastern Europe. The company formed joint partnerships in order to maintain control their brand.

They also opened a distribution centre in Ireland, which went into liquidation in 2007.

Industry recognition and awards

 June 2003: Recognized by Profit Magazine as being in the top 100 of Canada's Fastest Growing Businesses
 June 2004: Ranked by Profit Magazine as one of Canada's 100 Fastest Growing Businesses
 June 2005: Profit Magazine ranks BFM among Canada's Fastest Growing Businesses
 September 2005: Owners named Ernst & Young 2005 Entrepreneurs of the Year (Prairies Region, Manufacturing Category)
 January 2006: Ranks as one of Alberta's 50 Fastest Growing Companies
 February 2006: Named one of Canada's 50 Best Managed Companies
 May 2006: CAD designer Pete Van't Hoff wins International Business Award (Best Product Developer)
 June 2003 – 2012: Arctic Spas wins 5-Star Best Of Class Awards for the Pool & Spa Industry
 October 2019: EY Entrepreneur Of The Year 2019 Prairies winner

References

External links
 Arctic Spas

Companies based in Alberta
Hydrotherapy